Obioma is a surname and women's given name. Notable people with the surname include: 

Chigozie Obioma (born 1986), Nigerian writer
Godswill Obioma (born 1953), Nigerian academic
Iheanacho Obioma, Nigerian politician

Given name
Obioma Nnaemeka (born 1948), Nigerian-American academic
Obioma Okoli (born 1992), Nigerian weightlifter